The Heart of Illinois Fair is an annual fair located in Peoria, Illinois, featuring livestock competitions, rides, concessions, motor contests, and concerts. It is held at the Expo Gardens, a fairground in northwest Peoria.  A full hook up camping area is also featured on the grounds. Exposition Gardens is a non-profit organization whose goals involve providing opportunities for educational and recreational events.

Established in 1949, the fair has grown from being centered solely on rides, games, and foods to being centered on bigger events, such as rock concerts, livestock competitions, and tractor pulls.

2020 saw the fair go on hiatus until 2021, caused by COVID-19 pandemic.

Events

Concerts 
Over the past years, rock concerts have become a popular part of the fair.  The acts that were featured in the 2008 Heart of Illinois Fair included Mojo Risin (a Doors tribute band), Puddle of Mudd, Saving Abel, Drowning Pool, comedian Joe Recca, Next Generation Wrestling, Night Storm Teen Dance Party, and Confederate Railroad

Motorsports 
All motorsport events take place in the arena located at Expo Gardens.  Motorsports events and competitions include truck and tractor pulls, super semi pulls, demolition derbies, and bog and mud drags.

Livestock show 
The fair features livestock shows for beef cattle, dairy cattle, sheep, goats, horses, and pigs, as well as pig racing.

Home Arts 
The fair's Home Arts department features include gardening, floriculture, textiles, photography exhibits, food competitions, hobby shows, and science exhibits.

References 
Notes

Sources
 https://web.archive.org/web/20081017071644/http://www.pjstar.com/food/x99500084/Heart-of-Illinois-Fair-food-competition
 https://web.archive.org/web/20080609235236/http://1057thexrocks.com/SummerofRockatHOIFair/tabid/5319/Default.aspx
 https://archive.today/20130209034428/http://www.week.com/news/local/24445344.html
 https://archive.today/20130209050121/http://www.week.com/news/local/24533219.html
 http://www.heartofillinoisfair.com/

Festivals in Illinois
Agricultural shows in the United States
Annual fairs
Culture of Peoria, Illinois
Recurring events established in 1949
July events
Fairs in the United States
Tourist attractions in Peoria, Illinois
1949 establishments in Illinois